Summer Danielle Altice (born December 23, 1979) is a former American model and actress. She was named after Miss USA 1975, Summer Bartholomew.

Early life and education
Altice was born in Fountain Valley, California. She studied and played volleyball at San Diego State University and was named to the Academic All-WAC team.

Career
She won Young and Modern (YM) magazine's cover girl contest in 1995 plus she was on the cover of YM's November issue that year and subsequently signed with Elite modeling agency before appearing on the cover of GQ as well as men's magazines Maxim and Max.  She was ranked number 100 in Stuff magazine's "102 Sexiest Women In The World" in 2002.

Altice was Playboy's Playmate of the Month for August 2000.

One of her earliest film appearances was being cast in the films The Scorpion King, Grind, and the Showtime program ChromiumBlue.com.

Other ventures
Summer Altice continues to model while also working as a professional DJ for several nightclubs in L.A.

Filmography

References

External links
 
 "Interview: Summer Altice photo", AskMen.com.
 Summer Altice  on playmates.com

1979 births
Living people
People from Fountain Valley, California
American television actresses
2000s Playboy Playmates
Actresses from California
San Diego State Aztecs women's volleyball players
American film actresses